The following is a list of professional wrestling attendance records in Japan. The list is dominated by the country's largest promotion, New Japan Pro-Wrestling (NJPW). The company was founded by Antonio Inoki in 1972 and had a long rivalry with Giant Baba's All Japan Pro Wrestling. AJPW set a number of attendance records during its heyday, especially during the 1990s wrestling boom, however, only three of its shows remain on the list as of 2023.

According to this list, 5 events are from NJPW's flagship Wrestling World supercard event, which since 1992's Super Warriors in Tokyo Dome has been held exclusively at the Tokyo Dome which typically has a seating capacity of at least 42,000 people or more. Only six of the attendances listed are non-NJPW events, with the Weekly Pro Wrestling Tokyo Dome Show being an interpromotional event involving over a dozen Japanese promotions. In addition, NJPW has hosted three co-promotional events each with the U.S.-based World Championship Wrestling, two with the Japan-based UWF International, and one with deathmatch promotion Big Japan Pro Wrestling. All but two of the events have been held at the Tokyo Dome in the Japanese capital city of Tokyo, while one has been held at Sun Beach in Atami, Japan and one at Kawasaki Stadium in Kawasaki, Japan.

Events and attendances

Historical

See also

List of professional wrestling attendance records
List of professional wrestling attendance records in Europe
List of professional wrestling attendance records in Puerto Rico
List of professional wrestling attendance records in the United Kingdom
List of WWE attendance records
List of professional wrestling attendance records in Oceania

References

External links
Supercards & Tournaments: Japan
Wrestling attendance records in Japan at Wrestlingdata.com

J
Attendance records
Professional wrestling in Japan
professional wrestling